"Everybody's Laughing" is a song by  Alex Lloyd. The song was released in July 2002 as the fourth single from his second studio album, Watching Angels Mend. It peaked at number 33 in Australia.

Track listing
CD single 1
 "Everybody's Laughing" (Radio Edit)	
 "A Break Outside"	
 "Mystery Train"	
 "Red Guitar"

CD single 2
 "Everybody's Laughing" (Radio Edit)		
 "In Light"	
 "I'll Be Your Baby Tonight"	
 "Something"

Charts

Release history

References

2001 songs
2002 singles
Alex Lloyd songs
EMI Records singles